Lophosceles is a small genus from the fly family Muscidae.

Species List

L. alaskensis (Malloch, 1923)
L. cinereiventris (Zetterstedt, 1845)
L. frenatus (Holmgren\n, 1872)
L. hians Zetterstedt, 1838
L. minimus (Malloch, 1919)
L. mutatus (Fallén, 1825)

References

Muscidae
Diptera of Europe
Diptera of North America
Brachycera genera